Basketball at the 2001 Southeast Asian Games was held from 9 to 16 September 2001 in Kuala Lumpur, Malaysia. This edition featured both tournaments for men's and women's team. All matches were held in Malaysia Basketball Association Stadium.

The Philippines swept all of their assignments en route to their 12th overall men's title and sixth consecutive since the 1991 Games. Incidentally on the same venue was the last time the defending champions relinquished their SEA Games basketball, bowing to the hosts on the 1989 Southeast Asian Games. Meanwhile, Malaysia managed to defend the title they won since the 1997 edition, their second straight and their tenth overall women's title by edging Thailand in a nailbiter, 71–70.

Men's tournament

Participating nations

Results

Women's tournament

Participating nations

Results

References

2001
2001 Southeast Asian Games events
2001–02 in Asian basketball
International basketball competitions hosted by Malaysia